

The ANBO VI was a parasol-wing monoplane designed for the Lithuanian Army as a trainer in 1933, based on the ANBO III. It featured revised landing gear and a more powerful engine.

Operators

Lithuanian Air Force

Specifications (ANBO VI)

References

 
 Lithuanian Aviation Museum

Single-engined tractor aircraft
6
1930s Lithuanian military trainer aircraft
Parasol-wing aircraft
Aircraft first flown in 1933